Elevator Love Letter may refer to:

 "Elevator Love Letter" (song), a song by Stars from the album Heart
 "Elevator Love Letter" (Grey's Anatomy), episode of the American television medical drama Grey's Anatomy